Begoña Gumucio (born 14 January 1992) is a Chilean competitive sailor. She competed at the 2016 Summer Olympics in Rio de Janeiro, in the women's 49erFX.

References

1992 births
Living people
Chilean female sailors (sport)
Olympic sailors of Chile
Sailors at the 2016 Summer Olympics – 49er FX
Sailors at the 2015 Pan American Games
Pan American Games competitors for Chile
21st-century Chilean women